Sroka ("magpie" in Polish) is a Polish-language surname. It is a cognate of the Czech/Slovak surname Straka, Slovene Sraka, and East Slavic Soroka. Notable people with this surname include:

 Anna Sroka, Polish diplomat
 Bruno Sroka (born 1976), French male kitesurfer and adventurer
 Kristin Sroka (born 1977), German rhythmic gymnast
 Magdalena Sroka (born 1979), Polish politician
 Rafał Sroka (born 1970), Polish ice hockey player
 Włodzimierz Sroka (born 1967), Polish economist

See also
 

Polish-language surnames